Tiger Band is a nickname shared by a few collegiate marching bands:

 Louisiana State University Tiger Marching Band
 Princeton University Band
 Clemson University Tiger Band